The Pag Bridge is the bridge that connects the island of Pag to the Croatian mainland. It was opened on 17 November 1968, and it transformed life on the island of Pag to be able to function more as a peninsula.

The bridge was built by the local company Mostogradnja, designed by civil engineer Ilija Stojadinović, who also designed the nearby Šibenik Bridge. The location of the bridge near Velebit causes the bridge to endure strong gusts of wind, the bora, and during the construction the wind speed was 8 on the Beaufort scale for a period of four months.

References

Sources
 
 

Bridges completed in 1968
Cross-sea bridges in Croatia
Buildings and structures in Zadar County
Transport in Zadar County